Columcille is the debut solo album from flute and saxophone player Dave Fitzgerald who was a founding member of Iona. It was released in 1995.

Track listing
 "Veni Creator"  – 3:24
 "Veni Veni Emmanuel"  – 6:54
 "The Lark Ascending"  – 3:54
 "Sea of Glass"  – 4:09
 "In Paradisum"  – 4:50
 "Were You There"  – 4:51
 "The Dream"  – 8:25
 "Beata Viscera"  – 5:35
 "Columcille: Dove of the Church"  – 2:47
 "When I Survey"  – 2:55

Personnel
Dave Fitzgerald - Soprano & Tenor Saxophones, Flutes, Assorted Woodwind
Tim Oliver - Keyboards
Tim Brown - Counter Tenor, Vocals
Vanessa Freeman - Vocals (on Were You There)
Claire Tomlin - Soprano, Vocals (on The Dream & When I Survey)
Martin Neil - Percussion
Dave Clifton - Assorted Guitars

Release Details
1995, UK, ICC Records ICCD12730, Release Date ? ? 1995, CD
1995, UK, ICC Records ICC12720, Release Date ? ? 1995, Cassette

1995 debut albums
Dave Fitzgerald albums